Krasnoludek or krasnal is the Polish name for a mythological type of gnome or dwarf, common in many Polish and translated folk tales (for example, Brothers Grimm Snow White and the Seven Dwarfs is translated into the Polish language as Królewna Śnieżka i siedmiu krasnoludków). They resemble small humans and wear pointy red hats. Due to the popularization of fantasy literature, they are now differentiated from both gnomes (Polish: gnom) and dwarfs (Polish: krasnolud), both of which are used in fantasy literature context, while the word krasnoludek still remains mostly the domain of older folk tales. The word krasnal ogrodowy is also used to describe garden gnomes.

The mythological dwarf is of Germanic origin and appeared in Polish folktales in the 16th or 17th century. 

The word krasnoludek comes from the old Polish krasny, kraśny ("red, colorful," 
"nice-looking," or "good") and Polish ludek (small person or human-like creature).

See also 
 Wrocław's dwarfs

References

Gnomes
Dwarves (folklore)